Isaïe Schwartz (15 January 1876, in Traenheim – 1952, in Paris) was the Great Rabbi of France at the beginning of World War II.

References

Chief rabbis of France
Alsatian Jews
People from Bas-Rhin
1876 births
1952 deaths
20th-century French rabbis